The Denis Julien Inscription was left on a rock face in  along the Green River in Moffat County, Colorado by Denis Julien, a French-American trapper who was one of the few Europeans in the area in the 1830s. Julien made a practice of leaving his mark on locations along the Green and Colorado rivers, leaving at least eight such marks.  Four, including the Colorado mark, are listed on the National Register of Historic Places.

The inscription reads:

DJ       1838

The inscription is located in Whirlpool Canyon in what is now Dinosaur National Monument. The inscription was placed on the National Register of Historic Places on December 19, 1986.

See also
 Denis Julien Inscription (Grand County, Utah), Canyonlands National Park
 Denis Julien Inscription (San Juan County, Utah), Canyonlands National Park
 Julien Inscription Panel, Arches National Park

References

National Register of Historic Places in Colorado
Moffat County, Colorado
National Register of Historic Places in Dinosaur National Monument
1838 works